Kattangal is a sub-urban town situated near the National Institute of Technology Calicut, located in Kerala, India. It is about 22 km distant from the city of Kozhikode. Chathamangalam Gramapanchayath is the village administration and this village is a major educational hub in Kerala. Mavoor–Koduvally Road and Kozhikode–Mukkam Highways are crossing at Kattangal town.one can see a miniature form of india and of course kerala when you just walk through kattangal. This is due to manual workers from bengal and north Indianstates and major educational institutions.

Major educational institutions 
National Institute of Technology Calicut
DOEACC DOEACC.
Dayapuram Institutions run by Al Islam Charitable Trust .
KMCT College of Engineering
M.E.S. Raja Residential School 
Spring Valley School (Official Site)
R.E.C. Government Higher Secondary High School 
Technology Business Incubator TBI-NITC
School of management studies..SOMS
Naduvilottil group of institutions
 In its initial years (1997-2002), the Indian Institute of Management, Kozhikode operated from a wing of the NIT Calicut campus in Kattangal. When the IIM K campus' construction was complete, in adjoining Kunnamangalam, the institute shifted there.
Kmct Medical College Manassery
Alqamar Islamic school Kattangal

Companies run in Kattangal 
Infinite Open Source Solutions

Hostels functioning in this Village

Ladies Hostels
There are three hostels at N.I.T.C residential campus to accommodate lady students of UG, PG and Ph. D. of N.I.T.Calicut. Dayapuram Ladies Hostel located at Dayapuram Campus exclusive for Dayapuram institutions.
A Working Women's Hostel is also Functioning at Dayapuram Campus namely Rajiv Gandhi Working Women's Hostel Under Al Islam Charitable Trust .

Family Hostels
Faculty Apartments at N.I.T.C residential campus are for the PG and Research students staying with their family. Koyyapuram Family Apartments  located near Dayapuram Juma Masjid are exclusive for the students of N.I.T.C and Dayapuram Institutions.there are so many apartment situated in Company Mukku. Ayann apartment is one of the major of its kind

Boys Hostels
There are nine boys' hostels located at N.I.T.C academic for B.Tech. International Hostel (IH) and Faculty Apartments are for M. Tech, M.Sci. Tech and MCA students. The Gandhi Boys Hostel Dayapuram campus is for Dayapuram Students.

Neighboring towns and villages
 Kunnamangalam
 Koduvally
 Mavoor
 Kalanthode
 Manashery
 Mukkam
 Kodiyathur
 Malayamma
 Parathapoyil
 Karuvanpoyil
 Omassery

Rivers
Manipurampuzha (Kurungattukadave)

Distance from nearby places 
Kozhikode Railway Station 22 km
Calicut International Airport (CCJ)) 40 km
Kannur international airport  110 km
Mukkam 6 km, Koduvally 6 km, Mavoor 7.4 km, Kunnamangalam 7.5 km, thamarassery 16 km, Cheruvadi 8 km

Hospitals
Amala Clinic, kattangal jn.
MVR Cancer Centre & Research Institute, Chuloor
N.I.T.Calicut Clinic at N.I.T.Campus
Shanthi Hospital at Omashery
Mothercare Hospital, Government Health Centre, E.M.S.Hospital and Eye Care Hospital at Mukkam
St.Joseph Hospital at Agestian Muzhi
Calicut Medical College 
Kmct Medical College  manassery.
Dr Faiz's LuminousDental Clinic kattangal

Bank & ATM
State Bank Of India CREC Branch
Kattangal Service Co Operative Bank Ltd
The South Malabar Gramin Bank Ltd, Kettangal Branch
Calicut City Service Co-operative Bank at MVR Cancer Centre Choloor
SBI ATM at SBI Branch
SBI ATM Opposite N.I.T.Main Canteen
SBI ATM inside NITC campus
Punjab National Bank ATM in SOMS campus
Axis Bank ATM at MVR Cancer Centre Choloor

References

External links
National Institute of Technology Calicut
National Institute of Electronics and IT (NIELIT)
Poolakkode Vishnu Narasimna Temple
Dayapuram
KMCT College of Engineering
Technology Business Incubator TBI-NITC
Spring Valley School

Villages in Kozhikode district